Expect No Mercy is a 1995 action/science-fiction film starring Billy Blanks, Jalal Merhi, Wolf Larson, Laurie Holden, Anthony De Longis, and Michael Blanks. The soundtrack was composed by Varouje. The film was written by Stephen J. Maunder, produced by Jalal Merhi, and directed by Zale Dalen.

Premise
A virtual reality martial arts academy is being used as a front for a group of highly skilled assassins. The U.S. government has called in for their own top martial arts master to put a stop to this gang of killers.

Cast
 Billy Blanks as Agent Justin Vanier
 Jalal Merhi as Agent Eric
 Laurie Holden as Vicki
 Wolf Larson as Warbeck
 Anthony De Longis as Damian
 Michael Blanks as 'Spyder'
 Real Andrews as Alexander
 Brett Halsey as Bromfield
 Richard Fitzpatrick as Frank
 Geza Kovacs as Woods
 Jefferson Mappin as Wilkinson
 Sam Moses as Goldberg
 Bob Collins as Bertolucci
 Scott Hogarth as Goliath
 Bill Pickels as Samurai
 Layton Morrison as Destroyer
 Christopher Lee Clements as Boxer
 Rick Sue as Evil Clown
 Don Gough as Ninja / Enforcer
 Gary Chow as Gridman / Khan / Fango
 Gary "Si-Jo" Foo as Instructor Enforcer
 Lisa Jilon as Dominatrix

Home media
The movie was released on VHS by Imperial Entertainment and WarnerVision in 1995 and that same year in Canada by Alliance. In 2005, a DVD was released in Canada by Legacy Entertainment but in a full screen presentation that is merely a dupe of the original VHS. The Movie is being released in 2022 on blu ray by Vinegar Syndrome.

Production

The movie was filmed in July 1994 in Scarborough, Toronto, Ontario, Canada. Billy Blanks was cast at the last minute as a replacement for Olivier Gruner. Gary Daniels was also originally cast in the role of Warbeck but the U.S. distributors wanted Wolf Larson for the role.

Game tie-in
A computer game based on the film was released in 1996. The game is considered by many to be a knock-off of Mortal Kombat, by having digitized sprites of real people photographs, similar characters, and fatalities.

External links

The Unknown Movies review

1995 films
American martial arts films
American science fiction action films
Martial arts science fiction films
1990s science fiction action films
Films directed by Jalal Merhi
Films about virtual reality
Films directed by Zale Dalen
1995 martial arts films
1990s English-language films
1990s American films